Hani Saleh Rashid Abdullah (a.k.a. Said Salih Said Nashir) is a citizen of Yemen, held in extrajudicial detention in the United States Guantanamo Bay detainment camps, in Cuba.
His Internment Serial Number is 841.
American intelligence analysts estimate that Nashir was born in 1974, in Habilain, Yemen.

As of April 17th, 2022, Hani Saleh Rashid Abdullah has been held at Guantanamo for over 20 years.

Combatant Status Review Tribunal

Initially the Bush administration asserted that they could withhold all the protections of the Geneva Conventions to captives from the war on terror.  This policy was challenged before the Judicial branch. Critics argued that the USA could not evade its obligation to conduct a competent tribunals to determine whether captives are, or are not, entitled to the protections of prisoner of war status.

Subsequently, the Department of Defense instituted the Combatant Status Review Tribunals.  The Tribunals, however, were not authorized to determine whether the captives were lawful combatants—rather they were merely empowered to make a recommendation as to whether the captive had previously been correctly determined to match the Bush administration's definition of an enemy combatant.

Allegations
The allegations against Abdullah were:

Transcript
Nashir chose to participate in his Combatant Status Review Tribunal.
On March 3, 2006, in response to a court order from Jed Rakoff the Department of Defense published a three-page summarized transcript from his Combatant Status Review Tribunal.

First annual Administrative Review Board hearing
A Summary of Evidence memo was prepared for Hani Saleh Rashid Abdullah's 
annual Administrative Review Board on November 23, 2005.
The three
page memo listed twenty-two
"primary factors favor[ing] continued detention" and three
"primary factors favor[ing] release or transfer".
The factors he faced included:
 His neighbor's account of his own experience traveling to engage in jihad is alleged to have inspired Said Salih Said Nashir to travel to Afghanistan.  He is alleged to have accepted $300 from this neighbor.
 He was alleged to have stayed at a "Taliban guesthouse in Quetta, Pakistan and the Nebras guesthouse in Kandahar" on his way to the al Farouq training camp.
 He was alleged to have trained to use the Kalashnikov rifle, a pistol, rocket propelled grenades, hand grenades, land mines, Composition-3 (C-3) and Composition-4 (C-4) explosives, and how to read maps.
 He was alleged to have heard Usama bin Laden speak at al Farouq.
 He is alleged to have served as a guard at the Kandahar airport from September 11, 2001, to either late November 2001—or to December 3, 2001.  His CO at Kandahar was the head of the suspect guest house in Kabul named Khan Ghulam Bashah.
 The factors state he spent nine weeks traveling through clandestine routes from Afghanistan to Karachi.  They don't state an allegation as to what he did in the six months between his arrival in Karachi and his capture.

Second annual Administrative Review Board hearing
A Summary of Evidence memo was prepared for Hani Saleh Rashid Abdullah's 
annual Administrative Review Board on October 20, 2006.

The three page memo listed nineteen "primary factors favor[ing] continued detention" and three "primary factors favor[ing] release or transfer".
The factors he faced were essentially the same as those he faced in 2005, except that the man who was alleged to have commanded his ten-man squad at the Kandahar airport was alleged to have been al Qaeda's commander of the Northern Front in Kabul in 2000.

Boumediene v. Bush
On June 12, 2008, the United States Supreme Court ruled, in Boumediene v. Bush, that the Military Commissions Act could not remove the right for Guantanamo captives to access the US Federal Court system. Further, all previous Guantanamo captives' habeas petitions were reinstated.

On July 18, 2008, his attorneys, Charles H. Carpenter and Stephen M. Truitt, filed a "Status report for Hani Saleh Rashid Abdullah" summarizing the renewed petitions on his behalf.

Periodic Review

Abdullah's Guantanamo Review Task Force had concurred with earlier review boards, and recommended he be classed as too dangerous to release, although there was no evidence to justify charging him with a crime.
Carol Rosenberg, of the Miami Herald, wrote that the recommendation from him Periodic Review Board concluded that while he was "probably intended by al-Qaida senior leaders to return to Yemen to support eventual attacks in Saudi Arabia," that he may have been unaware of these plans.

At the time of his capture, Abdullah and five other men captured in Karachi at the same time were characterized as the "Karachi Six"—an al Qaeda sleeper cell. However, by the time he had his Periodic Review Board, analysts had stepped back from this assessment, and concluded that the men's capture at more or less the same time was a coincidence, and did not indicate they had been working together.

Abdullah was approved for transfer on October 29, 2020.

References

External links
	
 Who Are the Remaining Prisoners in Guantánamo? Part Seven: Captured in Pakistan (3 of 3) Andy Worthington, October 13, 2010
 The Guantánamo Files: Website Extras (11) – The Last of the Afghans (Part One) and Six "Ghost Prisoners Andy Worthington

Detainees of the Guantanamo Bay detention camp
Yemeni extrajudicial prisoners of the United States
Living people
1969 births